Rhigus is a genus of beetles belonging to the family Curculionidae.

List of species 
 Rhigus aesopus Schoenherr, 1826 
 Rhigus agricola Boheman, 1840 
 Rhigus araneiformis Schoenherr, 1826 
 Rhigus assimilis Cristofori & Jan, 1832 
 Rhigus atrox Germar, 1824 
 Rhigus bidentatus Boheman, 1833 
 Rhigus brunneus Bovie, 1907 
 Rhigus coelestinus Perty, 1832 
 Rhigus conspurcatus Cristofori & Jan, 1832 
 Rhigus contaminatus Dejean, 
 Rhigus dejeanii Gyllenhal 1833 
 Rhigus faldermanni Boheman, 1840 
 Rhigus fischeri Gyllenhal, 1833 
 Rhigus gyllenhalii Boheman, 1833 
 Rhigus horridus Schoenherr, 1826 
 Rhigus hypocrita Schneider, 1828 
 Rhigus irroratus Boheman, 1840 
 Rhigus lateritius Gyllenhal, 1833 
 Rhigus latruncularius Perty, 1832 
 Rhigus mannerheimii Gyllenhal, 1833 
 Rhigus melanozugos Schoenherr, 1826 
 Rhigus multipunctatus Dejean, 1835 
 Rhigus mutillarius Perty, 1832 
 Rhigus myrmosarius Perty, 1832 
 Rhigus nigrosparsus Perty, 1830
 Rhigus obesus Dejean, 
 Rhigus phaleratus Perty 1832 
 Rhigus schueppelii Germar 1824 
 Rhigus smaragdulus Herbst, J.F.W., 1795 
 Rhigus speciosus Schoenherr, 1840 
 Rhigus suturalis Hope, 
 Rhigus tesserulatus Schoenherr, 1826 
 Rhigus tribuloides Schoenherr, 1823 
 Rhigus tumidus Dalman, 1833 
 Rhigus vespertilio Pascoe, F.P., 1881

References 

 Encyclopedia of Life
 Global Species

Entiminae